The Piscina Mirabilis (Latin "wondrous pool") is an ancient Roman cistern on the Bacoli hill at the western end of the Gulf of Naples, southern Italy. It was one of the largest ancient cisterns. It was built under Augustus as suggested by the building technique of opus reticulatum used in the walls.

It was supported by vaulted ceilings and a total of 48 pillars.

It was thought to be situated there in order to provide the Roman western imperial fleet at Portus Julius with drinking water, but this is unlikely as the cistern is about 1 km away from the slopes of the promontory of Misenum where the military base and residential area port were located. Also, from the Augustan period the naval base was directly connected to the main Roman aqueduct, the Aqua Augusta, and did not need the cistern. More likely is that the cistern belonged to one of the many luxurious villas built in this area, like the nearby Grotta della Dragonara cistern.

The cistern was supplied with water from the Aqua Augusta, which brought water to most of the sites around Naples from sources in Serino near Avellino, 100 kilometres away.

Water was pumped out of the cistern using machines placed on the roof terrace of the cistern, which were increased in the 2nd century AD by adding a series of supporting barrel-vaulted rooms on the north side.

The ancient cistern is currently in private hands, but it may be visited by the public.

See also
List of Roman cisterns
Basilica Cistern
Cistern of Philoxenos
Theodosius Cistern
Classis Misenensis

References

External links 
Official Campania Tourism Site

Mirabilis
Buildings and structures in Campania
Mirabilis
Tourist attractions in Campania
Archaeological sites in Campania
Bacoli
Phlegraean Fields